Nothing Left to Fear is heavy metal/ progressive rock band Destiny's third album. It was released in autumn 1991 on both vinyl and CD.

Destiny also produced their first promotional video for a track from this album, The Evil Trinity. The video has played on several major networks.  Another two tracks from Beyond All Sense were re-recorded for this album - Sirens In The Dark and Rest in Peace.

The praise from the media was uniformly positive . "An almost perfect album", said Martin Carlsson, the acclaimed Swedish metal writer  . "Don't miss this album!", was the response from Annika Sundbaum-Melin of Aftonbladet.   "It's the very intriguing arrangements that keeps your interest alive, the music mirrors more feelings than just the aggressive and that's good", wrote Bert Gren of Göteborgsposten.

Track listing
""Nothing left to fear 5.30 Music:Kindberg/Björnshög Lyrics: Gram
"Medieval Rendezvous" 4.52 Music: Björnshög Lyrics: Gram
"The Evil Trinity" 4.46 Music: Björnshög/Kindberg Lyrics: Gram
"Sirens In The Dark" 5.57 Music: Björnshög/Österman Lyrics: Ring
"Sheer Death" 4.14 Music: Björnshög Lyrics: Gram
"F.Ö.S. 1.50 Music: Kindberg
"Beyond All Sense" 4.48  Music: Björnshög/Kindberg Lyrics: Gram
"No Reservation” 3.51  Music: Björnshög/Kindberg Lyrics: Gram
"The Raven"  3.45  Muic: Kindberg Lyrics: Gram
"Rest In Peace"  4.39 Music: Österman/Prodén Lyrics:Ring
”Gamla Du Fria” 0.57 Lyrics and music: Richard Dybeck, 1844 Trad Arr. Destiny 1990

Lineup 
Vocals: Zenny Gram
Bass: Stefan Björnshög
Guitar: Gunnar Kindberg
Drums: Peter Lundgren

1985 debut albums
Destiny (band) albums
Active Records albums